Kirsten Smith may refer to:

Kirsten Smith (writer) (born 1970), American screenwriter
Kirsten Smith (athlete), New Zealand track and field athlete